Areta is a surname possibly derived from Greek ἀρετή (arete) meaning "virtue".

References

Surnames